Vera Cordeiro (born 1950) is a Brazilian social entrepreneur and physician. She is founder and chairwoman of the board of Brazil Child Health  (Associação Saúde Criança).

Biography
Vera Cordeiro was born in Rio de Janeiro, Brazil, in 1950. Cordeiro received her MD as a general practitioner in 1975 from the Federal University of Rio de Janeiro (UFRJ).

From 1978 to 1998, she worked at the Hospital da Lagoa founding in 1979 the Psychosomatic Department. 

In 1991, she founded Associação Saúde Criança, a social organization that uses a pioneering methodology to promote the well-being of socially-vulnerable families, with long-term results, proven by researchers at Georgetown University in 2013. Saúde Criança was elected by NGO Advisor in 2018 the best social organization of Latin American and the 18th best of the world. Over the course of 26 years, Cordeiro has enabled the creation of 23 similar NGOs near public hospitals in six states in Brazil and other social entrepreneurs have spread the methodology in many countries all over the world and influenced public policy in the city of Belo Horizonte,
Brazil.

Cordeiro is an Ashoka fellow, a Skoll Foundation awardee, Schwab Foundation social entrepreneur, an Avina leader, a member of the World Council of Ashoka, and from 2005-2011 a board member of PATH: A Catalyst for Global Health.

She has expertise in economic opportunity, public policy, health, human rights, livelihoods, living conditions, peace, women and girls education.

References

Bibliography
Bornstein, David. How To Change The World: Social Entrepreneurs and The Power of New Ideas. Oxford University Press, NY: 2004, .

External links
 Vera Cordeiro at saudecrianca.org
 Interview with Vera Cordeiro by Social Innovation Conversations

1950 births
Living people
Ashoka Brazil Fellows
Businesspeople from Rio de Janeiro (city)
Brazilian women physicians
Brazilian general practitioners
20th-century Brazilian businesswomen
20th-century Brazilian businesspeople
Social entrepreneurs
21st-century Brazilian businesswomen
21st-century Brazilian businesspeople